Kevin John Pugh (born 11 October 1960) is an English former footballer who played as a midfielder in the Football League for Newcastle United and Darlington and in non-league football for Gateshead. He went on to play for many years in Belgian football, including seven seasons in the First Division, for Charleroi, La Louvière, Francs Borains and Sambreville.

Life and career
Pugh was born in Corbridge, Northumberland, and attended Framwellgate Moor Comprehensive School in Durham. Offered trials by several clubs, he chose to begin his club career with Newcastle United. He made only one substitute appearance for the club's first team, on 7 November 1981, replacing Imre Varadi in a 2–1 defeat at Chelsea in the Second Division. He was released at the end of that season, and dropped into non-league football with Gateshead, playing regularly as they won the 1982–83 Northern Premier League title and with it promotion to the Alliance Premier League. He began the new season with Gateshead, joined Darlington for long enough to make two substitute appearances in the Fourth Division, and was back with Gateshead by October. He finished his Gateshead career with 24 goals from 76 appearances in all competitions, 5 goals from 36 appearances in the Alliance Premier League.

Pugh continued his career in Belgium with Charleroi. He captained the team to promotion via a fifth-place finish and the Second Division play-offs in his first season, and remained with the club for a further seven seasons in the First Division. He then spent four years with La Louvière, two in the third tier followed by two in the second, and finished his playing career in the fourth tier with a year at Francs Borains and two at Sambreville, whom he also coached.

After retiring from football, Pugh stayed in Belgium where he ran a bar in Charleroi.

Notes

References

1960 births
Living people
People from Corbridge
Footballers from Northumberland
English footballers
Association football midfielders
Newcastle United F.C. players
Gateshead F.C. players
Darlington F.C. players
R. Charleroi S.C. players
R.A.A. Louviéroise players
English Football League players
Northern Premier League players
National League (English football) players
Belgian Pro League players
Francs Borains players